Lisy Christl (born 1964) is a German costume designer.

Christl started working as a costume designer in movies in 1995. She has worked with directors like Michael Haneke, Christian Petzold, Hans-Christian Schmid, and Florian Gallenberger. In 2009, she received a German Film Award for the costumes in Gallenberger's film John Rabe.

On January 24, 2012, she was nominated for an Academy Award for her Elizabethan costumes in Roland Emmerich's movie Anonymous.

See also
 List of German-speaking Academy Award winners and nominees

References

External links

Lisy Christl at filmportal.de
Lisy Christl, out of Anonymity – interviewmagazine.com

Living people
German costume designers
Women costume designers
Place of birth missing (living people)
1964 births